Martin Mikovič (born 12 September 1990) is a Slovak footballer who plays for Spartak Trnava as a left back or a winger.

Club career
He made his debut for Spartak Trnava against Senica on 10 April 2010.

On 28 February 2017, he signed a 3–year contract with Polish club Bruk-Bet Termalica Nieciecza.

Honours
Spartak Trnava
Slovnaft Cup: 2021–22

References

External links
 
 

1990 births
Living people
Sportspeople from Trnava
Slovak footballers
Slovakia under-21 international footballers
Association football midfielders
FC Spartak Trnava players
Bruk-Bet Termalica Nieciecza players
Slovak Super Liga players
2. Liga (Slovakia) players
Ekstraklasa players
I liga players
Expatriate footballers in Poland
Slovak expatriate sportspeople in Poland